Joaquim da Mota (born 29 May 1903, date of death unknown) was a Portuguese sports shooter. He competed in the 25 m pistol event at the 1936 Summer Olympics.

References

1903 births
Year of death missing
Portuguese male sport shooters
Olympic shooters of Portugal
Shooters at the 1936 Summer Olympics
Place of birth missing